Funny Money is a 1983 British crime film directed by James Kenelm Clarke and starring Gregg Henry, Elizabeth Daily and Derren Nesbitt. The Film was distributed by Cannon Films. The film's sets were designed by the art director Harry Pottle.

Plot
A pair of credit card thieves flee Las Vegas for London where they shelter in the Londonderry Hotel.

Cast
 Gregg Henry as Ben Turtle
 Elizabeth Daily as Cass
 Gareth Hunt as Keith Banks
 Derren Nesbitt as Jake Sanderson
 Annie Ross as Diana Sharman
 Joe Praml as Limping Man
 Rose Alba as Mrs. de Salle
 Stephen Yardley as Ridley
 Nigel Lambert as Vernon Birtwhistle
 Bill Mitchell as Gordeno
 Lyndam Gregory as Ashed
 Al Matthews as 1st Hood
 Carol Cleveland as Delphine
 Mildred Shay as Mrs. Keller
 Charles Keating as Ferguson
 Robert Henderson as Mr. Keller
 Alan Campbell as Barty Nichols
 Rai Bartonious as Gatzzi
 Fred S. Ronnow as Hoods' Chauffeur
 Johnnie Wade as Venables
 Ronald Chenery as Waiter

References

External links

1983 films
British crime drama films
1980s crime films
Golan-Globus films
Films shot in London
Films set in London
Films set in the Las Vegas Valley
Films directed by James Kenelm Clarke
1980s English-language films
1980s British films